1411 Brauna, provisional designation , is a stony Eoan asteroid from the outer regions of the asteroid belt, approximately 31 kilometers in diameter. It was discovered on 8 January 1937, by German astronomer Karl Reinmuth at the Heidelberg-Königstuhl State Observatory in Germany. The asteroid was named after Margret Braun, wife of Heidelberg astronomer Heinrich Vogt.

Orbit and classification 

Brauna is a member the Eos family, one of the largest asteroid family in the main belt consisting of nearly 10,000 asteroids. The family's parent body is the asteroid 221 Eos. Brauna is, however, a non-family asteroid of the main belt's background population when applying the Hierarchical Clustering Method to its proper orbital elements.

It orbits the Sun in the outer main-belt at a distance of 2.8–3.2 AU once every 5 years and 2 months (1,900 days). Its orbit has an eccentricity of 0.06 and an inclination of 8° with respect to the ecliptic.

The body's observation arc begins at the discovering Heidelberg Observatory, one month after its official discovery observation.

Physical characteristics 

Brauna is an assumed S-type asteroid.

Rotation period 

In September 2007, photometric observations at the Oakley Observatory in Indiana, United States, were used to build a lightcurve for Brauna. The asteroid displayed a well-defined rotation period of 4.90 ± 0.01 hours and a brightness variation of 0.15 ± 0.05 in magnitude.

Diameter and albedo 

According to the surveys carried out by the Japanese Akari satellite and the NEOWISE mission of NASA's Wide-field Infrared Survey Explorer, Brauna measures between 28.272 and 33.54 kilometers in diameter and its surface has an albedo between 0.070 and 0.096.

The Collaborative Asteroid Lightcurve Link derives an albedo of 0.0793 and a diameter of 31.17 kilometers based on an absolute magnitude of 10.9.

Naming 

This minor planet was named after Margret Braun (died 1991), wife of the Heidelberg astronomer Heinrich Vogt (1890–1968), after whom  was named. The previously numbered asteroid  was also named after Margret Braun. The official naming citation was mentioned in The Names of the Minor Planets by Paul Herget in 1955.

References

External links 
 Asteroid Lightcurve Database (LCDB), query form (info )
 Dictionary of Minor Planet Names, Google books
 Asteroids and comets rotation curves, CdR – Observatoire de Genève, Raoul Behrend
 Discovery Circumstances: Numbered Minor Planets (1)-(5000) – Minor Planet Center
 
 

001411
Discoveries by Karl Wilhelm Reinmuth
Named minor planets
19370108